This article shows the roster of all participating teams for the women's rugby sevens competition at the 2020 Summer Olympics. Each roster could have up to 12 athletes, however in July 2021, the International Olympic Committee allowed alternates to also compete due to the COVID-19 pandemic. This meant each team could have up to 13 athletes.

Group A

Great Britain

Great Britain's roster of 13 athletes was named on 18 June 2021.

Head coach: Scott Forrest

Holly Aitchison
Abbie Brown (c)
Abi Burton
Deborah Fleming
Natasha Hunt
Megan Jones (c)
Jasmine Joyce
Alex Matthews
Celia Quansah
Helena Rowland
Hannah Smith
Lisa Thomson
Emma Uren

Kenya

Kenya's roster of 13 athletes was named on 5 July 2021. Additionally, Enid Ouma was named as a non-travelling reserve athlete.

Head coach: Felix Oloo

Grace Adhiambo
Vivian Okwach
Camilla Atieno
Judith Okumu
Sinaida Omondi
Diana Ochieng
Sheila Chajira
Christabel Lindo
Janet Okelo
Philadelphia Olando (c)
Sarah Ndunde
Stellah Wafula
Leah Wambui

New Zealand

New Zealand's roster of 12 athletes was named on 2 July 2021. Additionally, Tenika Willison, Jazmin Hotham, and Terina Te Tamaki were named as travelling reserve athletes.

Head coach: Allan Bunting

Michaela Blyde
Kelly Brazier
Gayle Broughton
Theresa Fitzpatrick
Stacey Fluhler
Sarah Hirini (c)
Shiray Kaka
Tyla Nathan-Wong
Risi Pouri-Lane
Alena Saili
Ruby Tui
Portia Woodman

ROC

ROC's roster of 12 athletes is as follows.

Head coach: Andrey Kuzin

Anna Baranchuk
Iana Danilova
Baizat Khamidova
Marina Kukina
Daria Lushina
Daria Noritsina
Mariya Pogrebnyak
Kristina Seredina
Daria Shestakova
Nadezhda Sozonova
Alena Tiron (c)
Elena Zdrokova

Group B

Brazil

Brazil's roster of 12 athletes was named on 28 June 2021.

Head coach: Will Broderick

Luiza Campos
Isadora Cerullo
Thalia Costa
Thalita Costa
Marina Fioravanti
Aline Furtado
Raquel Kochhann (c)
Mariana Nicolau
Haline Scatrut
Bianca Silva
Leila Cássia Silva
Rafaela Zanellato

Canada

Canada's roster of 12 athletes and one alternate was named on June 25, 2021.

Head coach: Byrne

Elissa Alarie
Olivia Apps (alternate)
Britt Benn
Pamphinette Buisa 
Bianca Farella
Julia Greenshields 
Ghislaine Landry (c)
Kaili Lukan  
Kayla Moleschi 
Breanne Nicholas
Karen Paquin
Keyara Wardley
Charity Williams

Fiji

Fiji's roster of 12 athletes was named on 6 July 2021. Also Lavenia Tinai, Ana Maria Roqica, and Rejieli Uluinayau were initially named as travelling reserves. However, Tinai and Roqica were added to the squad to replace the injured Tokasa Seniyasi and Uluinayau.

Head coach: Saiasi Fuli

Lavena Cavuru
Raijieli Daveua
Sesenieli Donu
Laisana Likuceva
Rusila Nagasau (c)
Ana Naimasi
Alowesi Nakoci
Roela Radiniyavuni
Viniana Riwai
Ana Maria Roqica
Vasiti Solikoviti
Lavenia Tinai
Reapi Ulunisau

France

France's roster of 12 athletes was named on 5 July 2021. Additionally, Joanna Grisez was named as a replacement.

Head coach: Christophe Reigt

Coralie Bertrand
Anne-Cécile Ciofani
Caroline Drouin
Camille Grassineau
Lina Guérin
Fanny Horta
Shannon Izar
Chloé Jacquet
Carla Neisen
Séraphine Okemba
Chloé Pelle
Jade Ulutule

Group C

Australia

Australia's roster of 12 athletes was named on 3 July 2021.

Head coach: John Manenti

Madison Ashby
Charlotte Caslick
Dominique Du Toit
Demi Hayes
Tia Hinds
Maddison Levi
Faith Nathan
Sariah Paki
Shannon Parry (c)
Evania Pelite
Emma Tonegato
Sharni Williams (c)

China

China's roster of 13 athletes is as follows.

Head coach: Euan Mackintosh

Chen Keyi
Gu Yaoyao
Liu Xiaoqian
Ruan Hongting
Tang Minglin
Wang Wanyu
Wu Juan
Xu Xiaoyan
Yan Meiling
Yang Feifei
Yang Min (c)
Yu Liping
Yu Xiaoming

Japan

Japan's roster of 12 athletes was named on 19 June 2021.

Head coach: Hare Makiri

Wakaba Hara
Yume Hirano
Haruka Hirotsu
Marin Kajiki
Mifuyu Koide
Mio Yamanaka
Riho Kurogi
Hana Nagata
Mei Otani
Raichel Bativakalolo (c)
Mayu Shimizu (c)
Miyu Shirako
Honoka Tsutsumi

United States

United States' roster of 12 athletes was named on 17 June 2021.

Head coach: Rob Cain

 Kayla Canett-Oca
Lauren Doyle
Cheta Emba
Abby Gustaitis (c)
Nicole Heavirland
Alev Kelter
Kristi Kirshe
Ilona Maher
Jordan Matyas
Ariana Ramsey
Naya Tapper
Kristen Thomas (c)

References

Rugby sevens women
squads
2020